Bomber Crew is a real-time strategy video game developed by Runner Duck and published by Curve Digital. It was released on Microsoft Windows, OS X and Linux on 19 October 2017. It was released for PlayStation 4, Xbox One and Nintendo Switch on July 10, 2018. A sequel, Space Crew, was released in 2020.

Gameplay
The player gives commands to their crew and takes them through a campaign of reconnaissance, supply drops and/or bombing missions, set in World War II on a four-engine bomber aircraft loosely resembling the heavy bomber's of the time like the Avro Lancaster and the Handley Page Halifax. New upgrades and equipment become unlocked, and crew members can gain new skills as the game progresses. The gameplay has been compared to FTL: Faster Than Light. The game features permadeath on the player's crew.

Release
There are two packs released as downloadable content: Bomber Crew Secret Weapons, released as on December 15, 2017, and Bomber Crew: USAAF, released on October 23, 2018. The Nintendo Switch version released on June 6, 2019 in Japan.

Reception

The game received generally favorable or mixed reviews, according to review aggregator Metacritic.

Trivia
If a player has both Bomber Crew and Space Crew under their account, the active crew from Bomber Crew may be recruited via the recruitment bay in Space Crew.

References 

PlayStation 4 games
2017 video games
MacOS games
Video games developed in the United Kingdom
Windows games
Xbox One games
World War II video games
Works about the British Armed Forces
Video games set in 1942
Combat flight simulators
Nintendo Switch games
Curve Games games
Single-player video games
Runner Duck games